My Wife, My Cow and Me (French: Ma femme, ma vache et moi) is a 1952 French comedy film directed by Jean Devaivre and starring Erminio Macario, Irène Corday and Annette Poivre.

The film's sets were designed by the art director Claude Bouxin.

Synopsis
Bored of the country life, Marinette returns to Paris where she had been a dancer before her marriage. Her husband follows with his cow and small daughter in tow.

Cast
 Erminio Macario as Mario
 Irène Corday as Marinette
 Annette Poivre	
 Robert Balpo		
 Jean Daurand	
 Arthur Devère	
 Albert Dinan	
 Jacques Dufilho	
 Geno Ferny		
 Michel Galabru	
 Françoise Lauby
 Charles Lemontier		
 Marguerite Letombe	
 Maurice Marceau	
 Raoul Marco		
 Marcel Meral		
 Albert Michel		
 Arlette Poirier	
 Émile Riandreys
 Carlo Rizzo	
 Marcel Rouzé	
 Fernand Sardou

References

Bibliography 
 Rège, Philippe. Encyclopedia of French Film Directors, Volume 1. Scarecrow Press, 2009.

External links 
 

1952 films
1952 comedy films
French comedy films
1950s French-language films
Films directed by Jean Devaivre
Films set in Paris
1950s French films